Felix Huspek (born 13 November 1992) is an Austrian football player. He plays for SV Wallern.

Club career
He made his Austrian Football First League debut for SV Austria Salzburg on 24 July 2015 in a game against SKN St. Pölten.

Personal life
His older brother Philipp Huspek is also a football player.

References

External links
 
 Felix Huspek at ÖFB

1992 births
People from Grieskirchen District
Living people
Austrian footballers
SV Austria Salzburg players
FC Blau-Weiß Linz players
SV Ried players
SV Wallern players
2. Liga (Austria) players
Austrian Regionalliga players
Association football defenders
Footballers from Upper Austria